Squads for the Football at the 1986 Asian Games played in Seoul, South Korea.

Group A

Iraq
Coach: Akram Salman

Oman
Coach:Karl Heinz Heddergott

Pakistan
Coach: Younus Changezi

Thailand
Coach:  Burkhard Ziese

United Arab Emirates
Coach:

Group B

Bahrain
Coach:  Robbie Stepney

China PR
Coach: Nian Weisi

India
Coach: P. K. Banerjee

South Korea
Coach: Kim Jung-nam

Group C

Indonesia
Coach: Bertje Matulapelwa

Qatar
Coach:

Malaysia
Coach:  Josef Venglos

Saudi Arabia
Coach:  Carlos José Castilho

Group D

Bangladesh
Coach:  Golam Sarwar Tipu

Iran
Coach: Parviz Dehdari

Japan
Coach: Yoshinobu Ishii

Kuwait
Coach:  György Mezey

Nepal
Coach:

References

Korea Results

External links
RSSSF Japan

1986
Squads